Freret is a neighborhood of the city of New Orleans. The Freret neighborhood contains a thriving commercial corridor. A subdistrict of the Uptown/Carrollton Area, its boundaries as defined by the New Orleans City Planning Commission are: South Claiborne Avenue to the north, Napoleon Avenue to the east, LaSalle Street to the south and Jefferson Avenue to the west.

"Freret" is for Freret Street, which was named for William Freret, a mid-19th-century New Orleans mayor.

Geography

Adjacent neighborhoods
 Broadmoor (north)
 Milan (east)
 Uptown (south)
 Audubon (west)

Demographics
As of the census of 2010, there were 1,715 people, 648 households, and 363 family households.

Landmarks and Attractions

Restaurants / Bars / Amenities
The Freret Commercial Corridor, located on Freret Street between Jefferson and Napoleon Avenue, has over 17 restaurants, 3 coffee shops, and 3 bars, a continence store, and a grocery store.

Hotels
The 10 story, 90 room Alder Hotel is located in the former Bristow Tower on Magnolia Street,

See also
 New Orleans neighborhoods

References

Neighborhoods in New Orleans